Shenandoah County Courthouse is a historic courthouse building located at Woodstock, Shenandoah County, Virginia. It was built about 1790, as a single pile,
two-story, seven bay, structure with a facade of rough-hewn coursed limestone ashlar. A projecting
tetrastyle Tuscan portico was added in 1929 to the central three bays.  Atop the gable roof is a handsome hexagonal cupola with ogee-shaped roof above the belfry and surmounted by a short spire topped by a ball finial. A one-story Greek Revival style rear wing was added about 1840; a one-story clerk's office was added in 1880.

It was listed on the National Register of Historic Places in 1973.

The Shenandoah County Historical Society and County Tourism office operate the Visitor Center and Courthouse Museum in the historic courthouse.

References

External links
 Shenandoah County Historical Society

Courthouses on the National Register of Historic Places in Virginia
County courthouses in Virginia
Gothic Revival architecture in Virginia
1790 establishments in Virginia
Buildings and structures in Shenandoah County, Virginia
National Register of Historic Places in Shenandoah County, Virginia
Museums in Shenandoah County, Virginia
History museums in Virginia